Siri Austeng (27 April 1944 – 8 July 2017) was a Norwegian politician for the Labour Party.

She served as a deputy representative to the Norwegian Parliament from Hedmark during the term 1985–1989.

Following the 1995 elections, Austeng became the new county mayor (fylkesordfører) of Hedmark. She stepped down before the 2007 election.

She died on 8 July 2017 at the age of 73.

References

External links

1944 births
2017 deaths
Chairmen of County Councils of Norway
Deputy members of the Storting
Labour Party (Norway) politicians
Women members of the Storting
20th-century Norwegian politicians
20th-century Norwegian women politicians
21st-century Norwegian politicians
21st-century Norwegian women politicians
Women mayors of places in Norway